Gokul Sharma (born 25 December 1985) is an Indian cricketer who plays first-class cricket and List A cricket for Assam. He has also played for East Zone  in the Duleep Trophy. Sharma is a right-handed middle order batsman and right-arm off break bowler. He made his first-class debut against Tamil Nadu at Guwahati in 2004–05 Ranji Trophy.

He was the leading run-scorer for Assam in the 2017–18 Ranji Trophy, with 429 runs in six matches. He was also the leading run-scorer for Assam in the 2018–19 Ranji Trophy, with 570 runs in eight matches.

References

External links
 

1985 births
Living people
Indian cricketers
Assam cricketers
East Zone cricketers
Cricketers from Guwahati